The habitability of neutron star systems means assessing and surveying whether life is possible on planets and moons orbiting a neutron star.

A habitable planet orbiting a neutron star must be between one and 10 times the mass of the Earth. If the planet were lighter, its atmosphere would be lost. Its atmosphere must also be thick enough to convert the intense X-ray radiation emanating from the parent star into heat on its surface. Then it could have the temperature suitable for life.

A magnetic field strong enough — the magnetosphere — would protect the planet from the strong solar winds. This could preserve the planet's atmosphere for several billion years. Such a planet could have liquid water on its surface.

A Dutch research team published an article on the subject in the journal Astronomy & Astrophysics in December 2017.

See also 
 Habitability of red dwarf systems
 Habitability of K-type main-sequence star systems
 Habitability of natural satellites

References

Planetary habitability
Neutron stars
Astrobiology